Edgar Holden (March 24, 1914 – August 21, 2001) was an American politician who served in the Iowa House of Representatives from 1967 to 1975 and in the Iowa Senate from 1977 to 1989.

He died of prostate cancer on August 21, 2001, in Davenport, Iowa at age 87.

References

1914 births
2001 deaths
Republican Party members of the Iowa House of Representatives
Republican Party Iowa state senators
20th-century American politicians